Morten Hæstad (born 11 March 1987) is a retired Norwegian footballer. He is the younger brother of Kristofer Hæstad.

As a youth player Hæstad played for Randesund. He made his senior debut for IK Start and spent the 2006 season on loan to FK Haugesund.

He has been capped for Norway from under-17 level up to the Norwegian national under-21 team.

Career statistics

References

Club bio

1987 births
Living people
Sportspeople from Kristiansand
Norwegian footballers
IK Start players
FK Tønsberg players
FK Haugesund players
Kongsvinger IL Toppfotball players
Hønefoss BK players
Norwegian First Division players
Eliteserien players
Norway youth international footballers
Norway under-21 international footballers
Association football midfielders